Stylet may refer to:
An archaeological term for a type of flint tool found in Lebanon, also known as a Minet ed Dhalia point
Stylet (anatomy), a hard, sharp anatomical structure
In the medical industry a stylet is a slender medical probe or device.
For example, stylets used to facilitate tracheal intubation – see